"Sundream" is a song by Australian alternative dance group RÜFÜS. The song was released on 21 March 2014 as the fourth and final single from the group's debut studio album, Atlas (2013). The song peaked at number 47 on the ARIA Chart, becoming the group's first top 50 single.

At the 2014 Australian Independent Record Labels Association Awards, the song was nominated for Best Independent Dance/Electronica or Club Single.

At the ARIA Music Awards of 2014, the song was nominated for Best Group and Best Dance Release.

Reception
auspOp described the song as a "glorious burst of dazzling pop sunshine".

Larry Day from Music OMH said ""Sundream" skitters through the white-hot synth pads of '90s Ministry of Sound chillout compilations, Ibiza afterparties and the dawn breeze on a hangover. It's holiday hedonism encapsulated in 4:35 of blissed-out aural Bacchanalia."

Music video
The music video was directed by Katzki and Jackson Mullane and released on 15 April 2014.

Track listing

Charts

Certifications

Release history

References

2013 songs
2014 singles
Rüfüs Du Sol songs